A Cement mixer is a shot drink. It often consists of:

1 part Baileys Irish Cream (other types of alcoholic Irish cream may be substituted)
1 part lime juice (lemon juice may be substituted)

The drink is generally ingested by taking the shot of Baileys, holding it in the mouth, then sipping the lime juice and mixing both liquids either by swirling them around in the mouth or shaking the head.  The drink may also be combined as a layered shot, as the lime juice is less dense than most brands of Irish Cream.

The acidic lime juice causes the cream-based Baileys to curdle. The curdled Baileys does not taste sour, but it does rapidly gain viscosity and stick to the drinker's teeth, reminiscent of cement. For a sweeter taste, two shot glasses, one of lemonade and one of Baileys, can be used.

References

Cocktails with liqueur